The 1995–1996 Úrvalsdeild kvenna was the 39th season of the top-tier women's basketball league in Iceland. The season started on 6 October 1995 and ended on 13 March 1996. Keflavík won its 7th title by defeating KR 3–1 in the Finals.

Competition format
The participating teams first played a conventional round-robin schedule with every team playing each opponent once "home" and once "away" for a total of 18 games. The top four teams qualified for the championship playoffs while the bottom team was relegated to the second-tier Division I.

Regular season

Playoffs

Bracket

Semifinals

|}

Final

|}

Source: 1996 playoffs

Awards
All official awards of the 1995–96 season.

Domestic Player of the Year

Foreign Player of the Year

Domestic All-First Team

Best Young Player Award

Best Coach

Source

References

External links
Official Icelandic Basketball Federation website

Icelandic
Lea
Úrvalsdeild kvenna seasons (basketball)